Malacomys is a genus of rodents in the family Muridae native to Africa. It is the only member of the tribe Malacomyini.

It contains the following three species:
 Cansdale's swamp rat (Malacomys cansdalei) - Ansell, 1958
 Edward's swamp rat (Malacomys edwardsi) - Rochebrune, 1885
 Big-eared swamp rat (Malacomys longipes) - Milne-Edwards, 1877

References

 
Rodent genera
Taxa named by Henri Milne-Edwards
Taxonomy articles created by Polbot